The Rich Man's Daughter is a 2015 Philippine television drama romance series broadcast by GMA Network. Directed by Dominic Zapata, it stars Rhian Ramos and Glaiza de Castro. It premiered on May 11, 2015 on the network's Telebabad line up replacing Second Chances. The series concluded on August 7, 2015 with a total of 65 episodes. It was replaced by My Faithful Husband in its timeslot.

The series is streaming online on YouTube.

Premise
Jade Tanchingco is born into a wealthy and traditional Chinese-Filipino family. She always believed she would end up married to her boyfriend, David, until she falls in love with a woman, Althea Guevarra.

Cast and characters

Lead cast
 Rhian Ramos as Jade Tanchingco
 Glaiza de Castro as Althea Guevarra

Supporting cast
 Luis Alandy as David Limjoco
 Katrina Halili as Louella "Wila" Mateo
 Mike Tan as Paul Tanchingco
 Chynna Ortaleza as Batchi Luna
 Sheena Halili as Sally Lim-Tanchingco
 Gloria Romero as Ama Cecilia Tanchingco
 Pauleen Luna as Pearl Sy-Tanchingco
 Paolo Contis as Tommy Alvaro
 TJ Trinidad as Gabriel Tanchingco
 Charee Pineda as Angeline "Angie" San Jose
 Stephanie Sol as Abby Reyes-Luna
 Al Tantay as Oscar Tanchingco
 Glydel Mercado as Amanda Dionisio-Tanchingco
 Tony Mabesa as John Tanchingco

Guest cast
 Raquel Monteza as Julie Limjoco
 Bryan Benedict as Gerald Luna
 Eva Darren as Isabeli Tanchingco
 Bing Davao as Lucky Tanchingco
 Lito Legaspi as Felix Guevarra
 Marc Justine Alvarez as Miggy Alvaro
 Kariz Espinosa as Marinelle Luna
 Ken Alfonso as Lester
 Ken Chan as young Angkong
 Jackie Rice as young Ama
 Robert Arevalo as JunJun
 Andrew Schimmer as Jay
 Solenn Heussaff as Kathleen

Production
Marian Rivera was originally cast for role of Jade Tanchingco. She later left the series in April 2015, due to her pregnancy. In April 2015, Rhian Ramos was hired as replacement.

Ratings
According to AGB Nielsen Philippines' Mega Manila household television ratings, the pilot episode of The Rich Man's Daughter earned a 20.7% rating, which is the series' highest rating. While the final episode scored a 19.8% rating.

Accolades

References

External links
 
 

2015 Philippine television series debuts
2015 Philippine television series endings
2010s LGBT-related drama television series
Filipino-language television shows
GMA Network drama series
Lesbian-related television shows
Philippine LGBT-related television shows
Philippine romance television series
Television shows set in Quezon City